Robert Lindstedt and Sergiy Stakhovsky were the defending champions, but didn't participate.

Nicholas Monroe and Aisam-ul-Haq Qureshi won the title, defeating Chris Guccione and André Sá 6–2, 5–7, [10–4].

Seeds

Draw

Draw

References
 Main Draw

Irving Tennis Classic - Doubles